teve2 is a Turkish entertainment channel owned by Demirören Group. The channel launched on 18 August 2012 with the tv2 name to replace TNT, which had decided to withdraw from Turkish market due to difficulty. In 2016, the channel changed its name to teve2. Like most Turkish channels, both local and foreign programs are shown on the channel and the foreign programs may be broadcast either dubbed or its original language. The channel is mostly known for its broadcast of the game show Kelime Oyunu (Word Game in English).

teve2 HD 

teve2 HD is the high-definition version of the teve2 channel, the channel was launched in February 2013. Until 2014 the channel was only accessible through the D-Smart platform, but with the launch of the Turksat 4A satellite, it was added to Vodafone TV and the Turksat 4A satellite.

References

External links 

Official site 

Television stations in Turkey
Television channels and stations established in 2012
Bağcılar